Falęcin may refer to the following places:
Falęcin, Kuyavian-Pomeranian Voivodeship (north-central Poland)
Falęcin, Grójec County in Masovian Voivodeship (east-central Poland)
Falęcin, Płock County in Masovian Voivodeship (east-central Poland)
Falęcin, Pruszków County in Masovian Voivodeship (east-central Poland)